Oshosi (Yoruba: Ọ̀ṣọ́ọ̀sì, Portuguese: Oxóssi) is an Orisha of the Yoruba religion in West Africa and subsequently in Brazil and Cuba.

Yoruba

Oshosi is the spirit associated with the hunt, forests, animals, and wealth. He is spirit of meals, because it is he who provides food. He is associated with lightness, astuteness, wisdom, and craftiness in the hunt. He is the orisa of contemplation, loving the arts and beautiful things. He hunts with a bow and arrow (called an ofá), hunting for good influences and positive energies. Animals sacrificed to Oxóssi rituals are goat, cooked pig, and guinea fowl. The salutation of Ososi in the yoruba tradition is "Èku, aro".

Characteristics:
Consecrated day: Thursday
Color: blue in the Ketu nation, otherwise green
Ritual garment: blue
Sacred food: axoxô (maize cooked with coconut), black beans, yams, roasted cowpeas (of the subspecies Vigna sinensis)
Necklace: blue beads
Archetype: power, domain
Symbols: bow and arrow

Oxossí is syncretized with Saint Sebastian in the Rio de Janeiro region, the patron saint of the city. He is associated with Saint George in the Bahia region.

Santería

In Santería, Ochosí is syncretized with Saint Norbert. Oshosi is also syncretized with Saint Hubert: the imagery of St. Hubert has a bow and arrow and a stag next to him which are symbols of Oshosi. Another Catholic saint syncretized with Oshosi in Santeria is Saint Sebastian who is depicted with his body is covered with arrows, another symbol of Oshosi.

References

Brazilian deities
Abundance gods
Animal gods
Hunting gods
Justice gods
Nature gods
Santería
Yoruba gods